The 2005 Kisima Music Awards continued the expansion begun in the previous year, incorporating both entrants and acts from across East Africa including Musaimo, Ida and Diaspora. The ceremony was hosted by Tedd Kwaka ( Big Ted), Ugandan Diana Muyera and Kevin Ombajo, a well established personality in the entertainment arena.

Winners

See also

Kisima Music Awards

External links
2005 Kisima Award Winners

Kisima Music Award winners